Flying: The Early Years 1970–1973 is a compilation album by the British rock band UFO.

The compilation is the digitally remastered edition of 3 albums compiled to a double disc set. These recording encompass the complete Decca/Nova years from 1972–73 and the albums UFO 1, UFO 2 (a.k.a. Flying) and UFO Live. In addition to all of these tracks is the non-LP single, "Galactic Love" and its b-side, "Loving Cup", edited from the UFO Live album.

Track listing 
Disc 1
"Unidentified Flying Object"
"Boogie for George"
"C'Mon Everybody"
"Shake It All About"
"Timothy"
"Treacle People"
"Evil"
"Loving Cup" (BBC Session)
"Follow You Home" (BBC Session)
"Come Away (Melinda)" (BBC Session)
"Prince Kajuku"
"Coming of Prince Kajuku"
"Star Storm"

Disc 2
"Silver Bird"
"Flying"
"C'Mon Everybody" (live)
"Who Do You Love?" (live) (Ellas McDaniel)
"Prince Kajuku/Coming of Prince Kajuku" (live)
"Boogie for George" (live)
"Follow You Home" (live)
"Galactic Love" (single)
"Loving Cup" (B-Side)

2004 compilation albums
UFO (band) compilation albums
Castle Communications compilation albums